Alberts Chapel  is an unusual octagonal Methodist church located near the settlement of Sand Ridge, West Virginia, United States.  Built in the Carpenter Gothic-style, the simple, sparingly ornamented church rises to an octagonal cupola, with lancet windows and board-and-batten siding. The chapel was built in 1903 under the direction of Albert Poling by his uncle Charles Poling with materials provided by his brothers Asbury and Wesley.  The church was named for Albert in recognition of his efforts.

The chapel seats as many as 300, a surprising number for such an apparently small building. A possibly apocryphal account of the origins of the octagonal design suggests that the form was chosen "so that the devil couldn't corner you in it." Suffering from advanced deterioration the chapel was entirely rebuilt in 2004, with little of the original fabric remaining.

References

External links

 Calhoun Chronicle photo of Alberts Chapel
 Calhoun County GenWeb: Alberts Chapel United Methodist Church: with photos

Churches on the National Register of Historic Places in West Virginia
Churches completed in 1903
20th-century Methodist church buildings in the United States
Buildings and structures in Calhoun County, West Virginia
United Methodist churches in West Virginia
Octagonal churches in the United States
Carpenter Gothic church buildings in West Virginia
Victorian architecture in West Virginia
National Register of Historic Places in Calhoun County, West Virginia
Rebuilt buildings and structures in West Virginia